The Texas Association of Private and Parochial Schools, or TAPPS, is an organization headquartered in the Lone Star Tower at Texas Motor Speedway Fort Worth, Texas. It was formerly headquartered at the Salado Civic Center in Salado, Texas.

Founded in 1978, TAPPS governs athletic, fine arts, and academic contests for the majority of non-public high schools in Texas.

As of 2021 TAPPS organizes competitions for over 230 private schools in Texas.

History 
TAPPS was chartered in 1978 with a membership of 20 schools. As of 2022 TAPPS lists their school membership at 230 with a combined enrollment of over 40,000 students.  As early as 2013, TAPPS was using a proprietary software called TAPPSter to provide schools with online management tools for athletics and fine arts departments. In 2019 TAPPS signed a State Management contract with Rank One to serve schedules and game results to schools in their membership.

Controversies

In 2004, Darul Arqam, a Muslim school in Houston, submitted an application to join TAPPS.  Khaled Katbi, who represented the school, had a meeting with TAPPS on November 4, 2004, and did not report any unusual questions. However the school subsequently received a letter which included a questionnaire with "Why do you wish to join an organization whose membership is basically in total disagreement with your religious beliefs?" and "Why do you think that the current member schools of TAPPS will not be biased against your school, based on the fundamental difference in your religion and Christianity, since about 90% of TAPPS schools embrace Christianity?" In response the American Civil Liberties Union of Texas stated that TAPPS should be investigated.

In 2010, Iman Academy Southwest, another Muslim school in Houston, submitted an application to join TAPPS. TAPPS responded by asking Iman to complete a questionnaire with questions like "Historically, there is nothing in the Koran that fully embraces Christianity or Judaism in the way a Christian and/or a Jew understands his religion. Why, then, are you interested in joining an association whose basic beliefs your religion condemns?" Iman Academy SW did not fill out the questionnaire and the attached application, and TAPPS denied Iman SW admission into the league. Iman SW did not appeal the decision.

In 2012, TAPPS came under harsh criticism after it refused to reschedule a semifinals basketball game scheduled for 9 p.m. on Friday March 2 despite the fact that Robert M. Beren Academy, an Orthodox Jewish school, asked that its players not play on Jewish Sabbath. The school had won the regional championship to advance for their first trip to the semi-finals. An appeal was made by Beren academy but denied by TAPPS under its bylaws set in the 1970s. TAPPS received legal pressure and pressure from Mayor Annise Parker of Houston as well as hundreds of letters. TAPPS eventually relented and allowed the game to be rescheduled under this pressure.

The controversies with the Muslim schools and Beren drew attention to the point where the Texas Catholic Conference called for a review of the association.

In 2015, the TAPPS Winter Division 1 Soccer State Championship Game was stopped by Trinity Christian Academy coaches and Athletic Director to protest a yellow card that was issued by the referee to a John Paul II player. The TCA AD left the field of play and met with the TAPPS Executive Director. They walked back to the JPII bench together and the TAPPS Executive Director issued an Administrative Red card to the player, over ruling the referee in charge of the game. This violates TAPPS section 134 "NO PROTESTS. A protest base on a game or contest official's decision will not be considered" and TAPPS section 27 "...may not protest a contest judge's / referee's or other official's decision". The cause of the controversy was that after scoring a goal to go up 1-0 with 32 minutes left in the game the player removed his jersey on the way to the bench and was issued a yellow card for this unsportsmanlike behavior. JPII was forced to play 10 v 11 for the remainder of the game and lost 1-2.

Groupings
Like the UIL, TAPPS aligns member schools into districts by geography and enrollment size for various contests. Each contest has a slightly different alignment based on the participating schools, but most follow the same basic framework. The districts are mostly decided behind closed doors by TAPPS every even year (in February, around the same time as the UIL's biannual redistricting), and are an attempt to keep schools within a certain distance of their home town when attending competitions. Like the UIL, the districts are the first progression to the state championship.

Schools are further broken down with a letter classification to separate them from other schools of varying sizes. The purpose is ensure that schools compete only with others with similar size talent pools and resources.

Due to the wide variety of sports that some schools do and do not offer, and because some schools are single-sex, TAPPS uses several different classifications for sports (generally the larger the number the larger the school):
Volleyball, basketball (boys and girls): 1A, 2A, 3A, 4A, 5A, and 6A
Football: Divisions I/II and III for six-man football (in I/II the schools are grouped together into districts, but in the playoffs they have separate brackets); Divisions I, II, III/IV (in III/IV the schools are grouped together into districts, but in the playoffs they have separate brackets), plus League (divided into two zones) for the 11-man game
Baseball Divisions I through V
Soccer: Division I for Fall, Divisions I through III for Winter
Softball: Divisions I through IV

2020-2022 alignment

6A schools

District 1
 All Saints' Episcopal (Fort Worth)
 Liberty Christian School (Argyle)
 Midland Christian School (Midland)
 Nolan Catholic High School (Fort Worth)

District 2
 Bishop Lynch High School (Dallas)
 John Paul II High School (Plano)
 Parish Episcopal School (Dallas)
 Prestonwood Christian Academy (Plano)
 Trinity Christian Academy (Addison)
 Ursuline Academy (Dallas) (girls sports only)

District 3
 Antonian College Prep (San Antonio)
 St. Dominic Savio Catholic High School (Austin)
 Incarnate Word High School (San Antonio)
 San Antonio Christian School (San Antonio)

Central Catholic Marianist High School  (San Antonio)

District 4
 Concordia Lutheran High School (Tomball)
 Monsignor Kelly Catholic High School (Beaumont)
 Incarnate Word Academy (Houston)
 St. Agnes Academy (Houston)
 Pope John XXIII High School (Katy)
 St. Pius X High School (Houston)
 The Village School (Houston)

Independent
 Loretto Academy (El Paso)

5A schools

District 1
 Coram Deo Academy (Flower Mound)
 Faith Christian School (Grapevine)
 Fort Worth Christian (North Richland Hills)
 Prince of Peace (Carrollton)
 Legacy Christian Academy (Frisco)
 Southwest Christian (Fort Worth)

District 2
 Bishop Dunne Catholic School (Dallas)
 Brighter Horizons Academy (Garland)
 The Brook Hill School (Bullard)
 Cristo Rey (Dallas)
 Dallas Christian School (Mesquite)
 Grace Community School (Tyler)
 McKinney Christian Academy (McKinney)

District 3
 Brentwood Christian School (Austin)
 Geneva School of Boerne (Boerne)
 Hyde Park Baptist High School (Austin)
 Providence Catholic School (San Antonio)
 Regents School of Austin (Austin)
 St. Anthony School (San Antonio)
 Saint Mary's Hall (San Antonio)
 St. Michael's Catholic Academy (Austin)
 TMI Episcopal (San Antonio)

District 4
 Incarnate Word Academy (Corpus Christi)
 John Paul II High School (Corpus Christi)
 St. Augustine High School (Laredo)
 St. Joseph Academy (Brownsville)
 St. Joseph High School (Victoria)

District 5
 Cristo Rey Jesuit College Preparatory (Houston)
 The Emery/Weiner School (Houston)
 Fort Bend Christian Academy (Sugarland)
 Frassati Catholic High School (Spring)
 Lutheran South Academy (Houston)
 Second Baptist School (Houston)
 The Woodlands Christian Academy (The Woodlands)

Independent
 Lydia Patterson Institute (El Paso)

4A schools

District 1
 Covenant Christian Academy (Colleyville)
 Lake Country Christian School (Fort Worth)
 Lubbock Christian School (Lubbock)
 Trinity Christian School (Lubbock)
 Trinity School of Midland (Midland)
 Trinity Christian (Willow Park)

District 2
 All Saints Episcopal School (Tyler)
 The Covenant School (Dallas)
 Bishop Thomas K. Gorman Catholic School (Tyler)
 Grace Prep Academy (Arlington)
 Pantego Christian Academy (Arlington)
 The Shelton School (Dallas)

District 3
 Holy Cross of San Antonio (San Antonio)
 John Paul II High School (Schertz)
 Lutheran High School of San Antonio (San Antonio)
 Texas School for the Deaf (Austin)
 Veritas Academy (Austin)

District 4
 Cypress Christian School (Houston)
 Faith West Academy (Katy)
 The Woodlands Legacy Prep (Tomball/The Woodlands)
 Northland Christian School (Houston)

District 5
 Bay Area Christian School (League City)
 First Baptist Christian Academy (Pasadena)
 Logos Preparatory Academy (Sugar Land)
 St. Thomas Episcopal School (Houston)
 Westbury Christian School (Houston)

3A schools

District 1
 Calvary Christian Academy (Fort Worth)
 Midland Classical Academy (Midland)
 Fellowship Academy (Kennedale)
 Harvest Christian Academy (Watauga)
 San Jacinto Christian Academy (Amarillo)
 Temple Christian School (Fort Worth)

District 2
 Calvary Academy (Denton)
 Coram Deo Academy (Plano)
 The Highlands School (Irving)
 Dallas International School (Dallas)
 North Dallas Adventist Academy (Richardson)
 Lone Star High School (Gainesville) (boys sports only)

District 3
 Cornerstone Christian Academy (McKinney)
 Heritage Christian Academy (Rockwall)
 Lakehill Preparatory School (Dallas)
 Lucas Christian Academy (Lucas)
 Dallas Lutheran School (Dallas)
 Yavneh Academy (Dallas) (boys sports only)

District 4
 Central Texas Christian School (Temple)
 Holy Trinity Catholic High School (Temple)
 Live Oak Classical (Waco)
 Bishop Louis Reicher Catholic School (Waco)
 Vanguard College Preparatory School (Waco)

District 5
 Concordia Academy (Round Rock)
 Hill Country Christian School (Austin)
 Round Rock Christian Academy (Round Rock)
 San Juan Diego Catholic High School (Austin)

District 6
 The Christian School at Castle Hills (San Antonio)
 Keystone (San Antonio)
 Lone Star High School (Giddings) (boys sports only)
 New Braunfels Christian Academy (New Braunfels)
 Our Lady of the Hills (Kerrville)

District 7
 Alpha Omega Academy (Huntsville)
 Brazos Christian School (Bryan)
 Covenant Christian School (Conroe)
 Legacy Christian Academy (Beaumont)
 Lutheran High North (Houston)
 Providence Classical School (Spring)
 Rosehill Christian School (Tomball)

2A schools

District 1
 Abilene Christian School (Abilene)
 All Saints Episcopal School (Lubbock)
 Ascension Academy (Amarillo)
 Christ the King Catholic School (Lubbock)
 Kingdom Prep Academy (Lubbock)
 Southcrest Christian School (Lubbock)

District 2
 Bethesda Christian School (Fort Worth)
 Cristo Rey (Fort Worth)
 Covenant Classical School (Fort Worth)
 Sacred Heart Catholic School (Muenster)
 Texoma Christian School (Sherman)
 Weatherford Christian School (Weatherford)

District 3
 First Baptist Academy (Dallas)
 Garland Christian Academy (Garland)
 Longview Christian School (Longview)
 Ovilla Christian School (Red Oak)
 Trinity School of Texas (Longview)

District 4
 Allen Academy (Bryan)
 Faith Academy Marble Falls (Marble Falls)
 St. Joseph Catholic School (Bryan)
 Summit Christian Academy (Cedar Park)
 Austin Waldorf School (Austin)

District 5
 Bracken Christian (Bulverde)
 Faith Academy (Victoria)
 Sacred Heart High School (Hallettsville)
 St. Gerard Catholic High School (San Antonio)
 St. Paul Catholic High School (Shiner)

District 6
 Faith Christian Academy (Palmhurst)
 First Baptist School (Brownsville)
 Harvest Christian Academy (Edinburg)
 Juan Diego Academy (Mission)
 Macedonian Christian Academy (Alamo)
 Presbyterian Pan American (Kingsville)
 South Texas Christian Academy (McAllen)

District 7
 The Briarwood School (Houston)
 Chinquapin Preparatory School (Highlands)
 O'Connell College Prepratory (Galveston)
 Grace Christian School (Houston)

1A schools

District 1
 Christ Academy (Wichita Falls)
 Holy Cross Catholic Academy (Amarillo)
 Notre Dame Catholic School (Wichita Falls)
 Plainview Christian School (Plainview)
 Wichita Christian School (Wichita Falls)

District 2
 Alcuin School (Dallas)
 Cambridge School of Dallas (Dallas)
 Fairhill School (Dallas)
 Faustina Academy (Irving)
 StoneGate Christian Academy (Irving)
 The Winston School (Dallas)

District 3
 Canterbury Episcopal School (De Soto)
 Eagle Christian Academy (Waco)
 Tyler Street Christian Academy (Dallas)
 Waxahachie Prep (Waxahachie)
 The Westwood School (Dallas)

District 4
 Athens Christian Preparatory Academy (Athens)
 Greenville Christian School (Greenville)
 Christian Heritage School (Longview)
 Regents Academy (Nacogdoches)
 St. Mary's Catholic School (Longview)

District 5
 First Baptist Academy (Universal City)
 Gateway Christian School (San Antonio)
 Legacy Christian Academy (San Antonio)
 River City Believers Academy (Selma)

District 6
 Cornerstone Christian School (San Angelo)
 The Heritage School (Fredericksburg)
 Hill Country Christian School (San Marcos)
 Living Rock Academy (Bulverde)
 Trinity Lutheran Academy (San Antonio)
 The Atonement School (San Antonio)

District 7
 Faith Academy (Bellville)
 Calvary Baptist School (Conroe)
 Covenant Academy (Cypress)
 The Covenant Preparatory School (Kingwood)
 Founders Christian School (Spring)
 Paratus Classical Academy Lifestyle (Conroe)
 Oaks Adventist Christian School (Cypress)

District 8
 Baytown Christian Academy (Baytown)
 Brazosport Christian School (Lake Jackson)
 Family Christian (Houston)
 Living Stones (Alvin)
 The Beren Academy (Houston)
 Southwest Christian (Houston)

Independent
 Jesus Chapel (El Paso)

See also

 List of private schools in Texas

References

External links
 
 
 2018-2020 alignment

United States schools associations
Organizations based in Fort Worth, Texas
Education in Texas
High school sports associations in the United States
High school sports in Texas
1978 establishments in Texas